Camp songs or campfire songs are a category of folk music traditionally sung around a campfire for entertainment. Since the advent of summer camp as an activity for children, these songs have been identified with children's songs, although they may originate from earlier traditions of songs popular with adults. The tradition of singing around a campfire has existed for centuries. It has been suggested that a good campfire song will have a strong refrain or repeating structure so that others can participate easily. Campfire songs may be used alongside campfire stories.

References

Song forms
Sing-along